Amal Adam (born 24 December 1981) is an Egyptian archer. She won the bronze medal in the women's recurve event at the 2019 African Games held in Rabat, Morocco. She also won the gold medal in the women's team recurve event. She competed in the women's individual event at the 2020 Summer Olympics.

References

External links
 

1981 births
Living people
Egyptian female archers
African Games gold medalists for Egypt
African Games bronze medalists for Egypt
African Games medalists in archery
Competitors at the 2019 African Games
Olympic archers of Egypt
Archers at the 2020 Summer Olympics
Place of birth missing (living people)
20th-century Egyptian women
21st-century Egyptian women